The Romanian Open (also known as the BRD Năstase Țiriac Trophy) was a professional men's tennis tournament played on outdoor clay courts. It was part of the ATP World Tour 250 series of the ATP Tour. It was held annually in Bucharest, Romania, since 1993. Its name is taken from Romania's famous tennis players Ilie Năstase and Ion Țiriac.

The tournament never saw a Romanian winner in singles (though the 2005 edition saw two Romanian players reaching the semifinals, and the 2007 edition saw Victor Hănescu reach the finals), but a Romanian pair (Andrei Pavel and Gabriel Trifu) took home the doubles title in 1998. Also, Horia Tecău took three consecutive doubles titles at the tournament (2012, 2013 & 2014), each time with a different partner.

The organizers announced that from 2012, the ATP World Tour 250 series tournament would be scheduled to take place in April, thus ending a period of 19 years when it took place in the last week of September.

The last edition of the tournament was in 2016, as ATP has relocated it to Budapest.

Past finals

Singles

Doubles

See also  
 BRD Bucharest Open
 Transylvania Open
 Bucharest Open
 List of tennis tournaments

References

External links
Official website
atpworldtour.com profile

 
Tennis tournaments in Romania
Clay court tennis tournaments
Recurring sporting events established in 1993
Recurring sporting events disestablished in 2016
Tennis in Romania